Efik may refer to:

Efik people, an ethnic group located primarily in southeastern Nigeria
Efik language, the language of the Efik people
Efik mythology, the mythological beliefs of the Efik people
Efik religion, the traditional religion of the Efik people
Efik name, the indigenous names and the naming system of the Efik people.
Efik literature, the verbal and non-verbal literature of the Efik people.

Language and nationality disambiguation pages